The 2014–15 Prairie View A&M Panthers basketball team represented Prairie View A&M University during the 2014–15 NCAA Division I men's basketball season. The Panthers, led by ninth year head coach Byron Rimm II, played their home games at the William Nicks Building and were members of the Southwestern Athletic Conference. They finished the season 15–18, 12–6 in SWAC play to finish in fourth place. They advanced to the semifinals of the SWAC tournament where they lost to Texas Southern.

Roster

Schedule

|-
!colspan=9 style="background:#A020F0; color:#FFD700;"| Regular season

|-
!colspan=9 style="background:#A020F0; color:#FFD700;"| SWAC tournament

References

Prairie View A&M Panthers basketball seasons
Prairie View AandM